Dundee Township is a township in Walsh County, North Dakota, United States. 57.9% (62) of the population are male, and the other 42.1% (45) are female.

References

Townships in North Dakota
Townships in Walsh County, North Dakota